The Czech Republic participated in the Eurovision Song Contest 2022 in Turin, Italy, with the song "Lights Off" performed by the band We Are Domi. The Czech broadcaster Česká televize (ČT) organised the national final ESCZ 2022 in order to select the Czech entry for the 2022 contest. Seven entries competed in the national final and "Lights Off" performed by We Are Domi was announced as the winner on 16 December 2021 following the combination of votes from a twelve-member international jury panel, an international public vote and a Czech public vote.

Czech Republic was drawn to compete in the second semi-final of the Eurovision Song Contest which took place on 12 May 2022. Performing as the closing entry during the show in position 18, "Lights Off" was announced among the top 10 entries of the second semi-final and therefore qualified to compete in the final on 14 May. It was later revealed that Czech Republic placed fourth out of the 18 participating countries in the semi-final with 227 points. In the final, Czech Republic performed in position 1 and placed twenty-second out of the 25 participating countries, scoring 38 points.

Background 

The nation competed in the contest on three consecutive occasions between 2007 and 2009 without qualifying to the final. In , the country failed to qualify to the final with the song "Omaga" performed by Benny Cristo.

The Czech national broadcaster,  (ČT) broadcasts the event within Czech Republic and organises the selection process for the nation's entry. The broadcaster has used both national finals and internal selections to select the Czech Eurovision entry in the past. ČT confirmed their intentions to participate at the 2022 Eurovision Song Contest in September 2021. The broadcaster later confirmed in October 2021 that the Czech entry for the 2022 contest would be selected through a national final.

Before Eurovision

ESCZ 2022
ESCZ 2022 was the national final organised by ČT in order to select the Czech entry for the Eurovision Song Contest 2022. Seven entries participated in the competition which took place online between 7 and 15 December 2021, with the winner being selected via a jury and public vote and announced on 16 December 2021.

Competing entries 
Artists and composers were able to submit their proposals to the broadcaster between 16 September 2021 and 30 September 2021. Artists were required to have Czech citizenship and for groups of a maximum of six members, at least one of the lead vocalists were required to have Czech citizenship. Songwriters of any nationality were able to submit songs. The broadcaster received over 150 submissions at the closing of the deadline. ČT selected seven entries for the national final from the submissions received, which were presented to the public during a press conference on 6 December 2021.

Final 
Seven entries competed in the national final and the winner was determined by the combination of votes from a twelve-member international jury panel (50%), an international public vote (25%) and a Czech public vote (25%). The international jury consisted of former Eurovision entrants, while both international and Czech users were able to vote via the official Eurovision Song Contest application between 7 and 15 December 2021. The winner, "Lights Off" performed by We Are Domi, was announced on 16 December 2021.

The international jury panel consisted of:
 Victor Crone – represented  in 2019
 Tix – represented  in 2021
 Maraaya – represented  in 2015
 The Black Mamba – represented  in 2021
 Manizha – represented  in 2021
 Blind Channel – represented  in 2021
 Go_A – represented  in 2021
 Daði Freyr – represented  in 2021
 Gjon's Tears – represented  in 2021
 Paul Harrington - represented  in 1994 (with Charlie McGettigan)
 Charlie McGettigan - represented  in 1994 (with Paul Harrington)

At Eurovision 

According to Eurovision rules, all nations with the exceptions of the host country and the "Big Five" (France, Germany, Italy, Spain and the United Kingdom) are required to qualify from one of two semi-finals in order to compete for the final; the top ten countries from each semi-final progress to the final. The European Broadcasting Union (EBU) split up the competing countries into six different pots based on voting patterns from previous contests, with countries with favourable voting histories put into the same pot. On 25 January 2022, an allocation draw was held which placed each country into one of the two semi-finals, as well as which half of the show they would perform in. The Czech Republic was placed into the second semi-final, held on 12 May 2022, and was scheduled to perform in the second half of the show.

Once all the competing songs for the 2022 contest had been released, the running order for the semi-finals was decided by the shows' producers rather than through another draw, so that similar songs were not placed next to each other.

The Czech spokesperson, who announced the top 12-point score awarded by the Czech jury during the final, was Taťána Kuchařová.

Semi-final

We Are Domi took part in technical rehearsals on 3 and 6 May, followed by dress rehearsals on 11 and 12 May. This included the jury show on 11 May where the professional juries of each country watched and voted on the competing entries.

The Czech performance featured the members of We Are Domi appearing on stage wearing dark outfits: Dominika Hasek, located at the centre of the stage, in a strapless purple jumpsuit with yellow and cream accents, and Casper Hatlestad and Benjamin Rekstad, both of them on each side of her in DJ set-ups, in dystopian overalls. During the performance, the stage briefly went into darkness after the "so turn the lights off" refrain was sung. The LED screens displayed statues of David of Michelangelo, accompanied by pulsating silver lights around the arena. The art director for the performance was Matyáš Vorda, and the stage director was Vítek Bělohradský. An off-stage backing vocalist, Nikol Držmíšková, performed with We Are Domi.

At the end of the show, Czech Republic was announced as having finished in the top 10 and subsequently qualifying for the grand final. It was later revealed that the Czech Republic placed fourth in the semi-final, receiving a total of 227 points: 125 points from the televoting and 102 points from the juries.

Final
Shortly after the second semi-final, a winners' press conference was held for the ten qualifying countries. As part of this press conference, the qualifying artists took part in a draw to determine which half of the grand final they would subsequently participate in. This draw was done in the order the countries appeared in the semi-final running order. Czech Republic was drawn to compete in the first half. Following this draw, the shows' producers decided upon the running order of the final, as they had done for the semi-finals. Czech Republic was subsequently placed to perform in position 1, before the entry from Romania.

We Are Domi once again took part in dress rehearsals on 13 and 14 May before the final, including the jury final where the professional juries cast their final votes before the live show. The band performed a repeat of their semi-final performance during the final on 14 May. Czech Republic placed twenty-second in the final, scoring 38 points: 5 points from the televoting and 33 points from the juries.

Voting 

Voting during the three shows involved each country awarding two sets of points from 1-8, 10 and 12: one from their professional jury and the other from televoting. Each nation's jury consisted of five music industry professionals who are citizens of the country they represent. This jury judged each entry based on: vocal capacity; the stage performance; the song's composition and originality; and the overall impression by the act. In addition, each member of a national jury may only take part in the panel once every three years, and no jury was permitted to discuss of their vote with other members or be related in any way to any of the competing acts in such a way that they cannot vote impartially and independently. The individual rankings of each jury member in an anonymised form as well as the nation's televoting results were released shortly after the grand final.

Below is a breakdown of points awarded to the Czech Republic and awarded by the Czech Republic in the second semi-final and grand final of the contest, and the breakdown of the jury voting and televoting conducted during the two shows:

Points awarded to the Czech Republic

Points awarded by the Czech Republic

Detailed voting results
The following members comprised the Czech jury:
 Annabelle – singer, participated in Eurovision Song CZ 2022
 Jan Vávra – producer, broadcaster
 Marcell – singer-songwriter, performer
 Marta Říhová – musician, singer
 Ondra Fiedler – songwriter, producer

References 

2022
Countries in the Eurovision Song Contest 2022
Eurovision